Mercer County Schools is the operating school district within Mercer County, West Virginia. It is governed by the Mercer County Board of Education. Mercer County Public Schools is compiled of nineteen elementary schools, four middle schools, and four high schools. The current enrollment approximation in the Mercer County Public Schools is 9200 students.

Schools

High schools
Bluefield High School (9-12)
Montcalm High School (7-12)
PikeView High School (9-12)
Princeton High School (9-12)

Middle schools
Bluefield Middle School (6-8), feeds Bluefield High School

 PikeView Middle School (6-8), feeds PikeView High School
Princeton Middle School (6-8), feeds Princeton High School

Elementary schools
Athens Elementary School (K-5), feeds PikeView Middle School
Bluefield Intermediate (3-5), feeds Bluefield Middle School
Bluewell Elementary (K-5), feeds Bluefield Middle School
Ceres Elementary (K-5), feeds Bluefield Middle and Glenwood School
Glenwood School (K-8), feeds Princeton High School
Lashmeet/Matoaka (K-5), feeds PikeView Middle School
Melrose Elementary (K-5), feeds PikeView Middle School
Memorial Elementary (K-2), feeds Bluefield Intermediate
Mercer Elemenrary (K-5), feeds Princeton Middle School
Montcalm Elementary (K-6), feeds Montcalm High School
Oakvale Elementary School (K-5), feeds PikeView Middle School
Princeton Primary (K-2), feeds Mercer and Straley Elementary
Spanishburg School (K-5), feeds PikeView Middle School
Straley Elementary (3-5), feeds Princeton Middle School
Sun Valley Elementary (K-5), feeds Athens School
Whitethorn Elementary (K-2), feeds Bluefield Intermediate

Pre-kindergarten schools
Cumberland Heights
Silver Springs

Schools no longer in operation
Thorn Elementary (1997)
Wade Elementary

External links
Mercer County Schools

School districts in West Virginia
Education in Mercer County, West Virginia